Tom Feelings (May 19, 1933 – August 25, 2003) was an artist, cartoonist, children's book illustrator, author, teacher, and activist. He focused on the African-American experience in his work. His most famous book is The Middle Passage: White Ships/Black Cargo.

Feelings was the recipient of numerous awards for his art in children's picture books. He was the first African-American artist to receive a Caldecott Honor, and was the recipient of a grant from the National Endowment for the Arts in 1982. Born in Brooklyn, New York, he lived in New York City, Ghana, Guyana, and Columbia, South Carolina.

Biography 
Feelings was born on May 19, 1933 in the Bedford-Stuyvesant section of Brooklyn, New York.

Feelings studied cartooning at the Cartoonists and Illustrators School from 1951 to 1953 and, after serving in the Air Force working in the Graphics Division, returned to New York to study illustration at the now-renamed School of Visual Arts from 1957 to 1960.

His earliest known (signed) comic book work may be the story "Scandal" in Key Publication's third issue of Radiant Love (February 1953).

Feelings created the groundbreaking comic strip Tommy Traveler In the World of Negro History for the New York Age in 1958. Tommy Traveler is a black youth's dream adventures in American history while reading of notable black heroes. This material was released in book form in 1991.

In 1960 Feelings illustrated The Street Where You Live, a four-color comic for the NAACP's pamphlet on voter registration. Another example of Feelings's early work are the illustrations that accompanied "The Negro in the U.S." for Look Magazine, in 1961.

Feelings moved to Tema, Ghana, in 1964 and served as illustrator and consultant for the African Review, a magazine published by the Ghanaian government, until 1966.

In 1967, Feelings illustrated Crispus Attucks and the Minutemen, the third in Bertram Fitzgerald's Golden Legacy series of comic books about black history that eventually included sixteen volumes and was published until 1976. Crispus Attucks, the first casualty of the American Revolution, was also one of the historical figures that Feelings included in the Tommy Traveler comic strip.

From the late 1960s through the 1990s, Feelings concentrated on children's books, illustrating other authors' works as well as writing his own. Notable titles included To Be a Slave (written by Julius Lester), Moja Means One: Swahili Counting Book, Jambo Means Hello: A Swahili Alphabet Book, and The Middle Passage: White Ships/Black Cargo.

Feelings was married to fellow children's book author and his frequent collaborator Muriel Feelings from 1969 to 1974.

Feelings was an artist in residence and professor of art at the University of South Carolina in Columbia, SC from 1990 to 1996.

Feelings died aged 70 in 2003, in Mexico, where he had been receiving treatment for cancer.

Bibliography

Comic Books 

 Tommy Traveler in the World of Negro History (1958-?)
 "Crispus Attucks and the Minutemen," Golden Legacy #3 (1967)

Book Illustrations 

 Bola and Oba's Drummer by Letta Schatz (1967)
 To Be a Slave by Julius Lester (1968)
 Zamani Goes to Market by Muriel Feelings (1970)
 Moja Means One: Swahili Counting Book by Muriel Feelings (1971)
 Jambo Means Hello: Swahili Alphabet Book by Muriel Feelings (1974)
 Something on My Mind by Nikki Grimes (1978)
 Daydreamers by Eloise Greenfield (1981)
 Now Sheba Sings the Song by Maya Angelou (1987)

Words and Pictures 

 Tommy Traveler in the World of Black History by Tom Feelings (1991)
 Soul Looks Back in Wonder edited and illustrated by Tom Feelings (1993)
 The Middle Passage: White Ships/Black Cargo by Tom Feelings (1995)

Artists' Books 
 With Care by Ruth E. Edwards, illustrations by Tom Feelings

Awards 
To Be a Slave was recognized in 1969 as a Newbery Honor Book, an ALA Notable Book, a Hornbook Fanfare Best Book, the Library of Congress Children's Literature Center Best Children's Book, the School Library Journal's Best Book of the Year, and the Smithsonian Best Book of the Year. It was given a 1970 Lewis Carroll Shelf Award.

Feelings was a 1972 Caldecott Medal Honor recipient with his wife Muriel Feelings for their book Moja Means One: Swahili Counting Book.

Muriel and Tom Feelings also received a 1974 Boston Globe–Horn Book Award for the picture book Jambo Means Hello: A Swahili Alphabet Book. Jambo Means Hello was also 1975 Caldecott Medal Honor recipient.

Feelings's book The Middle Passage won the 1996 Coretta Scott King Award. In addition, it won a special commendation at the 1996 Jane Addams Children's Book Award ceremonies.

In 2001, the South Carolina Department of Education honored Feelings in its African-American History Month calendar alongside Merl Code, Sanco Rembert, Mamie Johnson, Bill Pinkney, and other notable black South Carolinians.

Further reading 
 
 
 
 
 
 
 
 X, Marvin. "On the Passing of an Artist of the People: Tom Feelings", ChickenBones: A Journal. Accessed July 18, 2013.

References

External links 
 "The Middle Passage: Drawings by Tom Feelings" – year 2000 exhibition of Feelings' work, McKissick Museum of the University of South Carolina
 Golden Legacy website
 Biographies of Tom and Muriel Feelings and samples of Tom's comic book work, including his masterpiece for the NAACP, The Street Where You Live
 
 Tom Feelings Artwork. James Weldon Johnson Collection in the Yale Collection of American Literature, Beinecke Rare Book and Manuscript Library.
 

1933 births
2003 deaths
American cartoonists
American children's book illustrators
People from Bedford–Stuyvesant, Brooklyn
African-American illustrators
African-American comics creators
American comics creators
School of Visual Arts alumni
Deaths from cancer in Mexico
20th-century African-American people
21st-century African-American people